You Got 'Em All is the debut studio album by American singer-songwriter Trent Harmon. It was released on May 18, 2018, by Big Machine Records. The album includes the singles "There's a Girl" and "You Got 'Em All".

Content
Two singles have been released from the disc: "There's a Girl" was issued in June 2016, and reached peaks of numbers 27 and 18 on Hot Country Songs and Country Airplay, respectively. The title track is the second single, and was sent to radio in February 2018. Jimmy Robbins served as the main producer of the disc.

Harmon wrote eight of the eleven songs on the disc, including the title track, which was inspired by a woman with whom Harmon was romantically involved.

Critical reception
Rating it an "A", Markos Papadatos of Digital Journal wrote that "Overall, Trent Harmon will melt your heart with his new studio effort You Got 'Em All. Each song on this project has its own identity. "

Commercial reception
The album debuted at No. 2 on Billboards Heatseekers, No. 34 on Country, No. 60 on Top Album Sales. It has sold 4,500 copies in the United States as of June 2018.

Track listing

Personnel
Adapted from the album liner notes.

Tim Brennan – record engineering assistance
Scott Borchetta – executive production
Tom Bukovac – acoustic guitar, electric guitar
Adam Chagnon – additional engineering
Savannah Church – background vocals
Bryan Cook – record engineering
David Davidson – violin
George Doering – acoustic guitar, banjo, mandolin
David Dorn – keyboards
Dan Fornero – trumpet
Ben Fowler – record engineering
Serban Ghenea – mixing
Mike Griffith – production coordination
John Hanes – engineering for mixing
Tim Heitz – programming
Dan Higgins – tenor sax
David Huff – programming
Sean Hurley – bass
Victor Indrizzo – drums
Ted Jensen – mastering
Allison Jones – A&R
Charlie Judge – keyboards
Nik Karpen – mixing assistance
Laurel Kittleson – production coordination
Nick Lane – trombone
Chris Lord-Alge – mixing
Randy Merrill – mastering
Carl Miner – acoustic guitar
Jamie Muhoberac – keyboards
Emily Nelson – cello
Nir Z – record engineering, digital editing, drums, percussion
Danny Rader – acoustic guitar
Julian Raymond – production
Kyle Richards – record engineering assistance
Jimmy Robbins – production, record engineering, mixing, digital editing, acoustic guitar, electric guitar, bass, keyboards, programming, percussion, background vocals
Joel Peskin – baritone sax
Tim Pierce – acoustic guitar
Bennett Salvay – keyboard
Tyler Shields – record engineering assistance
Jimmie Lee Sloas – bass
Janice Soled – production coordination
Brianna Steinitz – production coordination
Ilya Toshinsky – acoustic guitar
Laura Veltz – background vocals
Derek Wells – electric guitar, banjo, mandolin
Kristin Wilkinson – strings, violin, viola
Howard Willing – mixing
Ryan Young – record engineering assistance

Charts

References

2018 debut albums
Big Machine Records albums
Trent Harmon albums
Albums produced by Julian Raymond